Psychology in Russia: State of the Art is an annual peer-reviewed academic journal covering theoretical and empirical research in psychology in Russia. The journal is abstracted and indexed in PsycINFO and Scopus. The editors-in-chief are Yury P. Zinchenko and Viktor F. Petrenko (Moscow State University).

External links
 

Annual journals
Moscow State University
Publications established in 2008
Open access journals
English-language journals
Psychology journals